James George Veneris (1922–2004) was an American soldier during the Korean War who was captured by the Chinese and was one of 21 American soldiers at the end of the war who decided they would rather stay in China than return to the United States.

Early life and education
James Veneris was born into a Greek immigrant family, in Vandergrift, Pennsylvania, and grew up in Detroit, Michigan. He dropped out of high school and for the most part was involved in petty crime to survive. When given the option of joining the U.S. Armed Forces or going to jail, he decided to enter the Army in hopes of getting education and learning a trade.

Career
Veneris had served in the South Pacific during World War II and said he re-enlisted because he couldn't find anything else to do and hoped Army life would provide security.

Defection

At the end of military action, all POWs in Korea were given the option by their captors of returning to their home countries or remaining with the Chinese. Veneris elected to stay in China since during his time in the prison camp he was treated well and learned Chinese. He was promised employment and education if he remained in China, so he decided to remain. (Personal Communication, 1978)

Life in China
Veneris and fellow former POW Howard Gayle Adams stayed in Jinan through the turmoil of the Cultural Revolution, sheltered by their factory co-workers and an announcement by Premier Zhou Enlai calling them "international freedom fighters". In 1963, he was allowed to study at the People's University of China. After graduation, Veneris returned to the same factory. His first Chinese wife died from lung disease after ten years of marriage. In 1967, Veneris married a Chinese divorcee. In 1977, he became an English professor at Shandong University. Veneris returned to the United States twice, first in 1976 to celebrate the Bicentennial and again sometime in the late 1990s. He was one of the subjects of the 2005 documentary  They Chose China which was directed by Shui-Bo Wang and produced by the National Film Board of Canada.

Personal life
After he chose to live in China, the U.S. Army gave Veneris a dishonorable discharge and refused to provide back pay for his time in prison camp. The Chinese gave him a stipend and moved him to Shandong province, where he was given a job in a state-run pulp factory in Jinan that turned discarded cloth shoes into toilet paper for export to Hong Kong. He adopted the Chinese name Lao Wen (老温). Veneris had a daughter and a son who were raised in China and moved to the United States in the 1990s.

Death
Veneris died in China in 2004 and was buried in Shandong.

References

External links
They Chose China, NFB documentary (2005) on American POW's who chose to stay in China
Where are they now? New lives, old secrets

See also
List of American and British defectors in the Korean War
Samuel David Hawkins
Korean War
Greek Americans

1922 births
2004 deaths
United States Army soldiers
United States Army personnel of World War II
United States Army personnel of the Korean War
American defectors to China
American prisoners of war in the Korean War
People from Vandergrift, Pennsylvania
American people of Greek descent
Military personnel from Pennsylvania